FFME may refer to :

 Fédération française de la montagne et de l'escalade, the French Federation of Mountaineering and Climbing ;
 :fr:Fédération française des maisons de l'Europe, a French NGO currently headed by Martine Buron ;
 the DS 100 code of Frankfurt Messe station (Bahnhof Frankfurt am Main Messe), in Germany.